Forbidden Nights is a 1990 American made-for-television drama film directed by Waris Hussein and based on the article The Rocky Course of Love in China written by Judith Shapiro. The film was shot in Hong Kong and stars Melissa Gilbert, Robin Shou and Victor K. Wong. The film also marked the American debut of Shou, who wouldn't act in another American film until Mortal Kombat in 1995.

Plot 
Set in Red China in 1979, the film focuses on Judith Shapiro, an American teacher who falls in love with Liang Heng, a Chinese radical, trying to bring political reform to his homeland. She puts all her wishes and dreams away to fit into his ideals, but soon, trouble starts to come.

Cast
 Melissa Gilbert as Judith Shapiro
 Robin Shou as Liang Heng
 Victor K. Wong as Ho
 Tzi Ma as Li Dao
 Stephen Fung as Young Liang Hong

References

External links

1990 television films
1990 films
1990 drama films
Films set in 1979
Films set in the Republic of China (1912–1949)
Films shot in Hong Kong
1990s English-language films
Films about interracial romance
Films directed by Waris Hussein
CBS network films
Warner Bros. films
American drama television films
1990s American films